Omar Abdel Aziz (born September 11, 1983 in Cairo) is a professional squash player.

Career
Aziz represented Egypt at the international level. He reached a career-high ranking of World No. 31 in June 2010.

References

External links 
 
 

Egyptian male squash players
Living people
1983 births
Sportspeople from Cairo
Competitors at the 2009 World Games
21st-century Egyptian people